Keegan Pereira (born 7 November 1987) is an Indian professional footballer who plays as a left back for East Bengal FC.

Club career

Early career
Born in Borvali I C Colony Mumbai, Maharashtra, from 2006 to 2012 Pereira played for Mumbai in the I-League. While with Mumbai, Keegan Pereira scored a goal against Salgaocar on 29 April 2011 at the Cooperage Ground as Mumbai won 3–2.

After spending six years with Mumbai, Keegan joined former I-League champions Salgaocar where he spent an entire season without playing a single game. He played in the local Goa Football League where he was a player to watch out for and In January 2013, he signed for an I-League 2nd Division team DSK Shivajians. Keegan appeared 6 times for DSK and scored once against Rangdajied United in the group stages, but could not help his team qualify for the final round.

Bengaluru FC
In June 2013, it was announced that Pereira had signed with new direct-entry side Bengaluru FC for the 2013–14 I-League season. He made his debut for the side in their opening I-League match ever on 22 September 2013 against Mohun Bagan in which he started and played the full game also gaining a penalty for BFC after being brought down by a Mohun Bagan defender in the penalty box as Bengaluru drew 1–1.

Mumbai City FC
In July 2015 Pereira was drafted to play for Mumbai City FC in the 2015 Indian Super League.

International career
Pereira made played his first match for India against Laos on 7 June 2016. He was 508th player to represent India.

Personal life
Keegan Pereira's brother, Dane Pereira is also a footballer, who plays for Mumbai F.C. Keegan Pereira is married to Lorna Tone on January 2, 2016 and has a son born on May 19, 2017.

References

1987 births
Living people
Footballers from Mumbai
Indian footballers
India international footballers
Mumbai FC players
Salgaocar FC players
Bengaluru FC players
Mumbai City FC players
East Bengal Club players
Association football fullbacks
I-League players
I-League 2nd Division players